Nobusuke (written 信輔 or 信介) is a masculine Japanese given name. Notable people with the name include:

, Japanese politician and Prime Minister of Japan
, Japanese politician

Japanese masculine given names